Hooghly Institute of Technology, established in 1951, is a government polytechnic located in Vivekananda Road, Pipulpati,  Hooghly district, West Bengal. This polytechnic is affiliated to the West Bengal State Council of Technical Education,  and recognized by AICTE, New Delhi. This polytechnic offers diploma courses in Mechanical, Electrical, Civil, Chemical Engineering.

External links
 Admission to Polytechnics in West Bengal for Academic Session 2006-2007

References

Universities and colleges in Hooghly district
Educational institutions established in 1951
1951 establishments in West Bengal
Technical universities and colleges in West Bengal